Lee Pei-chi (born 16 October 1994) is a Taiwanese professional tennis player.

Lee has won 11 singles and 20 doubles titles on the ITF Circuit. On 31 March 2014, she reached her best singles ranking of world No. 389. On 16 January 2023, she peaked at No. 217 in the doubles rankings.

Lee made her WTA Tour main-draw debut at the 2016 Taiwan Open in the singles and doubles competitions.

ITF Circuit finals

Singles: 19 (11 titles, 8 runner–ups)

Doubles: 45 (20 titles, 25 runner-ups)

Notes

References

External links
 
 

1994 births
Living people
Taiwanese female tennis players
Tennis players at the 2014 Asian Games
Tennis players at the 2018 Asian Games
Asian Games competitors for Chinese Taipei
Universiade medalists in tennis
Universiade silver medalists for Chinese Taipei
Medalists at the 2019 Summer Universiade
21st-century Taiwanese women